The Man Hunter is a lost 1919 silent film western drama directed by Frank Lloyd and starring William Farnum. Fox Film Corporation produced and distributed the picture.

Cast
 William Farnum - George Arnold
 Louise Lovely - Helen Garfield
 Charles Clary - Henry Benton
 Marc Robbins - Joseph Carlin
 Leatrice Joy - Florence

See also
 1937 Fox vault fire

References

External links
 
 

1919 films
1919 Western (genre) films
Lost Western (genre) films
Films directed by Frank Lloyd
Fox Film films
American black-and-white films
Lost American films
1919 lost films
Silent American Western (genre) films
1910s American films
1910s English-language films